Specklinia viridiflora is a species of orchid plant native to Brazil.

References 

viridiflora
Flora of Brazil